Bascanichthys filaria is an eel in the family Ophichthidae (worm/snake eels). It was described by Albert Günther in 1872. It is a tropical, marine eel which is known from Irian Jaya, Indonesia, in the western central Pacific Ocean.

References

Ophichthidae
Fish described in 1872
Taxa named by Albert Günther